Hurricane Bar is the second album from the Swedish band Mando Diao, released in 2004. The album was chosen as No. 92 of Amazon.com's Top 100 Editor's Picks of 2005.

The tracks for the limited edition's bonus disc were recorded at the Southside Festival in Tuttlingen (Germany) on 11 June  2005.

Track listing
 "Cut the Rope" 1:51
 "God Knows" 3:52
 "Clean Town" 3:43
 "Down in the Past" 3:58
 "You Can't Steal My Love" 5:30
 "Added Family" 4:18
 "Annie's Angle" 3:04
 "If I Leave You" 2:53
 "Ringing Bells" 2:36
 "This Dream Is Over" 3:24
 "White Wall" 3:51
 "All My Senses" 4:13
 "Kingdom & Glory" 4:16
 "Next to Be Lowered" 3:45
US bonus tracks
 "Clean Town" (video)
 "God Knows" (video)
 "Down in the Past" (video)
Japan bonus tracks
 "Your Lover's Nerve" (B-side)
 "Jeanette" (previously unreleased)
Limited edition bonus tracks
 "Son of Dad" (previously unreleased) 4:39
 "Telephone Song" (previously unreleased) 4:01

Limited edition bonus disc
 "Intro" 1:13
 "Cut the Rope (Live)" 0:41
 "Sweet Ride (Live)" 3:01
 "Paralyzed (Live)" 4:24
 "If I Leave You (Live)" 2:59
 "Added Family (Live)" 4:15
 "The Band (Live)" 3:56
 "White Wall (Live)" 3:10
 "Motown Blood (Live)" 3:28
 "Mr. Moon (Live)" 4:41
 "You Can't Steal My Love (Live)" 6:31
 "Annie's Angle (Live)" 2:36
 "Chi Ga (Live)" 2:06
 "Down in the Past (Live)" 5:32
 "God Knows (Live)" 4:46
 "Sheepdog (Live)" 5:29

Personnel
Mando Diao
Björn Dixgard - vocals, guitars
Gustaf Noren - vocals, guitars, organ, percussion
Carl-Johan Fogelklou - bass, backing vocals, organ
Samuel Giers - drums, percussion, backing vocals

Additional musicians
Mats Björke - keyboards (tracks 2,4,5,6,10,11,12,14)
Patrik Heikinpieti - percussion (tracks 7,9,12)

2004 albums
Mando Diao albums